Shabeer Bapu Sharfudheen is an Indian Kabaddi athlete. He was selected by State Bank of India - Mysore to play the sport.
He is from Kerala, living in Ummini of Palakkad District, a well farming area of rice. He is one among the national sportsmen from the locality. 

He played at the India camp from 2011-2014.

Pro Kabaddi League

He was purchased by  U Mumba, the U Mumba franchisee of Pro Kabaddi League. He played for U Mumba for 2 seasons before switching alliance to Jaipur Pink Panthers for season 3 and season 4 before returning to U Mumba for season 5 

He is bought by Tamil Thalaivas in 2019 auction.

References 

Indian kabaddi players
1986 births
Living people
Pro Kabaddi League players
Sportspeople from Palakkad
Kabaddi players from Kerala